Princess Fragrance, released as Gebi Enchou Lu (戈壁恩仇录) in mainland China, is a 1987 Hong Kong film based on Louis Cha's novel The Book and the Sword. The film is a sequel to The Romance of Book and Sword, released earlier in the same month and also directed by Ann Hui.

The film is largely seen as a faithful adaptation of the original novel; however, it is less available now due to limited releases on VCD and DVD.

Plot
The film covers the second half of the Louis Cha's novel The Book and the Sword. It introduces another protagonist, Princess Fragrance, who does not appear in the first film The Romance of Book and Sword. Fuk'anggan does not appear in the film.

Cast
Zhang Duofu as adult Chen Jialuo
Jiang Wei as young Chen Jialuo
Aiyinuo as Princess Fragrance
Chang Dashi as Qianlong Emperor
Liu Jia as Huoqingtong
Ding Cuihua as Luo Bing
Lü Yongquan as Taoist Wuchen
Yu Dalu as Zhao Banshan
Guo Bichuan as Wen Tailai
Wang Jingqiu as Zhang Jin
Hou Changrong as Yu Yutong
Chen Youwang as Xu Tianhong
Ren Naichang as Shi Shuangying
Zhang Jun as Chang Bozhi
Wang Wei as Chang Hezhi
Zheng Jianhua as Jiang Sigen
Fu Yongcai as Wei Chunhua
Sun Chenxi as Xinyan
Wang Hongtao as Yu Wanting
Wu Chunsheng as Zhang Zhaozhong
Yang Junsheng as Heshen
Ding Tao as Zhaohui
Si Gengtian as Messenger
A'Si'er as Dahu
Kuli Sitan as Erhu
Fan Yin as Sanhu
Jiapa'er as Sihu
Hadi'er as Muzhuolun
Aniwa'er as Huo'ayi

External links

1987 films
Hong Kong martial arts films
Films directed by Ann Hui
Films based on The Book and the Sword
Wuxia films
Films about rebels
Qianlong Emperor
1980s Hong Kong films